The 2006 Plymouth City Council election was held on 4 May 2006 to elect members of Plymouth City Council in England. One third of the council was up for election on the day, with an additional seat in Southway Ward remaining vacant until a by-election on 22 June. After the election, Labour were reduced to 28 out of the 56 filled seats, thus temporarily losing control of the council to No Overall Control. However, Labour won the Southway by-election on 22 June, thus restoring their overall control of the council.

Overall results

|-
| colspan=2 style="text-align: right; margin-right: 1em" | Total
| style="text-align: right;" | 19
| colspan=5 |
| style="text-align: right;" | 60,804
| style="text-align: right;" |

Ward results

Budshead

Compton

Devonport

Drake

Efford and Lipson

Eggbuckland

Ham

Honicknowle

Moor View

Peverell

Plympton Chaddlewood

Plympton St Mary

Plymstock Dunstone

Plymstock Radford

St Budeax

St Peter and the Waterfront

Southway

Stoke

Sutton and Mount Gould

See also
 List of wards in Plymouth

References

2006 English local elections
May 2006 events in the United Kingdom
2006
2000s in Devon